The 1994 Fife Regional Council election, the sixth and final election to Fife Regional Council, was held on 5 May 1994 as part of the wider 1994 Scottish regional elections. The election saw Labour maintaining their control of the region's 46 seat council.

Aggregate results

Ward results

References

1994 Scottish local elections
1994
May 1994 events in the United Kingdom